The 2021–22 QMJHL season was the 53rd season of the Quebec Major Junior Hockey League (QMJHL). The league plans on returning to a full 68-game regular season having begun on October 1, 2021 and ending on May 1, 2022.

The playoffs started May 5, 2022 and ended on June 11, 2022 with teams competing for the President's Cup. The winning team, the Shawinigan Cataractes were awarded the President's Cup and participated in the 2022 Memorial Cup, which is being hosted by the Saint John Sea Dogs.

Regular season standings

Note: GP = Games played; W = Wins; L = Losses; OTL = Overtime losses; SL = Shootout losses; GF = Goals for; GA = Goals against; PTS = Points; x = clinched playoff berth; y = clinched division title; z = clinched Jean Rougeau Trophy

Eastern Conference

Western Conference

Scoring leaders
Note: GP = Games played; G = Goals; A = Assists; Pts = Points; PIM = Penalty minutes
Source: TheQMJHL.ca

Leading goaltenders
Note: GP = Games played; Mins = Minutes played; W = Wins; L = Losses: OTL = Overtime losses; SL = Shootout losses; GA = Goals Allowed; SO = Shutouts; GAA = Goals against average
Source: TheQMJHL.ca

2022 President's Cup playoffs 
In the first two rounds seeding is determined by conference standings, and in the two final rounds seeding is determined by overall standings.

Conference quarter-finals

Western Conference quarter-finals

(1) Sherbrooke Phoenix vs. (8) Baie-Comeau Drakkar

(2) Gatineau Olympiques vs. (7) Val d'Or Foreurs

(3) Shawinigan Cataractes vs. (6) Rouyn-Noranda Huskies

(4) Drummondville Voltigeurs vs. (5) Blainville-Boisbriand Armada

Eastern Conference quarter-finals

(1) Quebec Remparts vs. (8) Chicoutimi Saguenéens

(2) Charlottetown Islanders vs. (7) Moncton Wildcats

(3) Saint John Sea Dogs vs. (6) Rimouski Océanic

(4) Acadie–Bathurst Titan vs. (5) Halifax Mooseheads

Conference semi-finals

Western Conference semi-finals

(1) Sherbrooke Phoenix vs. (5) Blainville-Boisbriand Armada

(2) Gatineau Olympiques vs. (3) Shawinigan Cataractes

Eastern Conference semi-finals

(1) Quebec Remparts vs. (6) Rimouski Océanic

(2) Charlottetown Islanders vs. (4) Acadie–Bathurst Titan

President's Cup Semifinals

(1) Quebec Remparts vs. (7) Shawinigan Cataractes

(2) Charlottetown Islanders vs. (4) Sherbrooke Phoenix

President's Cup Finals

(2) Charlottetown Islanders vs. (7) Shawinigan Cataractes

Playoff leading scorers
Note: GP = Games played; G = Goals; A = Assists; Pts = Points; PIM = Penalties minutes

Playoff leading goaltenders

Note: GP = Games played; Mins = Minutes played; W = Wins; L = Losses: OTL = Overtime losses; SL = Shootout losses; GA = Goals Allowed; SO = Shutouts; GAA = Goals against average

Trophies and awards
President's Cup – Playoff Champions: Shawinigan Cataractes
Jean Rougeau Trophy – Regular Season Champions: Quebec Remparts
Luc Robitaille Trophy – Team with the best goals for average: Saint John Sea Dogs
Robert Lebel Trophy – Team with best GAA: Quebec Remparts

Player
Michel Brière Memorial Trophy – Most Valuable Player: William Dufour, Saint John Sea Dogs
Jean Béliveau Trophy – Top Scorer: Joshua Roy, Sherbrooke Phoenix
Guy Lafleur Trophy – Playoff MVP: Mavrik Bourque, Shawinigan Cataractes
Jacques Plante Memorial Trophy – Top Goaltender: Charles-Antonie Lavallée, Shawinigan Cataractes
Guy Carbonneau Trophy – Best Defensive Forward: Jacob Gaucher, Baie-Comeau Drakkar
Emile Bouchard Trophy – Defenceman of the Year: Lukas Cormier, Charlottetown Islanders
Kevin Lowe Trophy – Best Defensive Defenceman: Noah Laaouan, Charlottetown Islanders
Michael Bossy Trophy – Top Prospect: Nathan Gaucher, Quebec Remparts
RDS Cup – Rookie of the Year: Jakub Brabenec, Charlottetown Islanders
Michel Bergeron Trophy – Offensive Rookie of the Year: Jakub Brabenec, Charlottetown Islanders
Raymond Lagacé Trophy – Defensive Rookie of the Year: David Spacek, Sherbrooke Phoenix
Frank J. Selke Memorial Trophy – Most sportsmanlike player: Jordan Dumais, Halifax Mooseheads
QMJHL Humanitarian of the Year – Humanitarian of the Year: Brett Budgell, Charlottetown Islanders
Marcel Robert Trophy – Best Scholastic Player: Charlie Truchon, Quebec Remparts
Paul Dumont Trophy – Personality of the Year: Joshua Roy, Sherbrooke Phoenix

Executive
Ron Lapointe Trophy – Coach of the Year: Jim Hulton, Charlottetown Islanders
Maurice Filion Trophy – General Manager of the Year: Patrick Roy, Quebec Remparts

All-Star Teams 
First All-Star Team:
 Samuel Richard, Goaltender, Rouyn-Noranda Huskies
 Lukas Cormier, Defenceman, Charlottetown Islanders
 Miguël Tourigny, Defenceman, Acadie–Bathurst Titan
 William Dufour, Forward, Saint John Sea Dogs
 Patrick Guay, Forward, Charlottetown Islanders
 Joshua Roy, Forward, Sherbrooke Phoenix

Second All-Star Team
 Jan Bednář, Goaltender, Acadie–Bathurst Titan
 Vincent Sévigny, Defenceman, Saint John Sea Dogs
 William Villeneuve, Defenceman, Saint John Sea Dogs
 Zachary Bolduc, Forward, Quebec Remparts
 Jordan Dumais, Forward, Halifax Mooseheads
 Xavier Parent, Forward, Sherbrooke Phoenix

All-Rookie Team:
 Nathan Darveau, Goaltender, Victoriaville Tigres
 Niks Fenenko, Defenceman, Baie-Comeau Drakkar
 David Spacek, Defenceman, Sherbrooke Phoenix
 Maxim Barbashev, Forward, Moncton Wildcats
 Jakub Brabenec, Forward, Charlottetown Islanders
 Mathieu Cataford, Forward, Halifax Mooseheads

See also
 List of QMJHL seasons
 2021–22 OHL season
 2021–22 WHL season

References

External links
 Official QMJHL website
 Official CHL website

Quebec Major Junior Hockey League seasons
Qmjhl